In six-dimensional geometry, a cantellated 6-cube is a convex uniform 6-polytope, being a cantellation of the regular 6-cube.

There are 8 cantellations for the 6-cube, including truncations. Half of them are more easily constructed from the dual 5-orthoplex.

Cantellated 6-cube

Alternate names
 Cantellated hexeract
 Small rhombated hexeract (acronym: srox) (Jonathan Bowers)

Images

Bicantellated 6-cube

Alternate names
 Bicantellated hexeract
 Small birhombated hexeract (acronym: saborx) (Jonathan Bowers)

Images

Cantitruncated 6-cube

Alternate names
 Cantitruncated hexeract
 Great rhombihexeract (acronym: grox) (Jonathan Bowers)

Images

It is fourth in a series of cantitruncated hypercubes:

Bicantitruncated 6-cube

Alternate names
 Bicantitruncated hexeract
 Great birhombihexeract (acronym: gaborx) (Jonathan Bowers)

Images

Related polytopes

These polytopes are part of a set of 63 uniform 6-polytopes generated from the B6 Coxeter plane, including the regular 6-cube or 6-orthoplex.

Notes

References
 H.S.M. Coxeter: 
 H.S.M. Coxeter, Regular Polytopes, 3rd Edition, Dover New York, 1973 
 Kaleidoscopes: Selected Writings of H.S.M. Coxeter, edited by F. Arthur Sherk, Peter McMullen, Anthony C. Thompson, Asia Ivic Weiss, Wiley-Interscience Publication, 1995,  
 (Paper 22) H.S.M. Coxeter, Regular and Semi Regular Polytopes I, [Math. Zeit. 46 (1940) 380-407, MR 2,10]
 (Paper 23) H.S.M. Coxeter, Regular and Semi-Regular Polytopes II, [Math. Zeit. 188 (1985) 559-591]
 (Paper 24) H.S.M. Coxeter, Regular and Semi-Regular Polytopes III, [Math. Zeit. 200 (1988) 3-45]
 Norman Johnson Uniform Polytopes, Manuscript (1991)
 N.W. Johnson: The Theory of Uniform Polytopes and Honeycombs, Ph.D. 
  o3o3o3x3o4x - srox, o3o3x3o3x4o - saborx, o3o3o3x3x4x - grox, o3o3x3x3x4o - gaborx

External links 
 Polytopes of Various Dimensions
 Multi-dimensional Glossary

6-polytopes